Pseudachorutes is a genus of springtails in the family Neanuridae. There are more than 50 described species in Pseudachorutes.

Species
These 53 species belong to the genus Pseudachorutes:

 Pseudachorutes americanus Stach, 1949
 Pseudachorutes aphysus Christiansen & Bellinger, 1980
 Pseudachorutes aureofasciatus (Harvey, 1898)
 Pseudachorutes beta Najt & Weiner, 1991
 Pseudachorutes bifidus Christiansen & Bellinger, 1980
 Pseudachorutes bobeitio Najt & Weiner, 1997
 Pseudachorutes boerneri Schött, 1902
 Pseudachorutes chazeaui Najt & Weiner, 1991
 Pseudachorutes cheni
 Pseudachorutes complexus (Macgillivray, 1893)
 Pseudachorutes corticicolus (Schaeffer, 1896)
 Pseudachorutes crassus da Gama, 1964
 Pseudachorutes curtus Christiansen & Bellinger, 1980
 Pseudachorutes deficiens
 Pseudachorutes dubius Krausbauer, 1898
 Pseudachorutes geronensis (Massoud, 1963)
 Pseudachorutes ignotus Christiansen & Bellinger, 1980
 Pseudachorutes indiana Christiansen & Bellinger, 1980
 Pseudachorutes janstachi
 Pseudachorutes labiatus
 Pseudachorutes laricis Arbea & Jordana, 1989
 Pseudachorutes legrisi Thibaud & Massoud, 1983
 Pseudachorutes libanensis (Cassagnau & Delamare, 1955)
 Pseudachorutes longisetis Yosii, 1961
 Pseudachorutes lunata Folsom, 1916
 Pseudachorutes medjugorjensis Barra, 1993
 Pseudachorutes minor Peja, 1985
 Pseudachorutes nica Palacios-Vargas & Mejía-Madrid, 2012
 Pseudachorutes octosensillatus
 Pseudachorutes ouatilouensis Najt & Weiner, 1997
 Pseudachorutes pachyrostris Becker, 1948
 Pseudachorutes palmiensis Börner, 1903
 Pseudachorutes parvulus Börner, 1901
 Pseudachorutes plurichaetosus Arbea & Jordana, 1991
 Pseudachorutes poahi Christiansen & Bellinger, 1992
 Pseudachorutes polychaetosus
 Pseudachorutes pratensis Rusek, 1973
 Pseudachorutes reductus Thibaud & Massoud, 1983
 Pseudachorutes romeroi Simon, 1985
 Pseudachorutes rugatus Wray, 1952
 Pseudachorutes saxatilis Macnamara, 1920
 Pseudachorutes scythicus
 Pseudachorutes simplex Maynard, 1951
 Pseudachorutes subabdominalis Steiner, 1958
 Pseudachorutes subcrassoides Mills, 1934
 Pseudachorutes subcrassus Tullberg, 1871
 Pseudachorutes tamajonensis Simon, 1985
 Pseudachorutes tavignani Poinsot-Balaguer, 1978
 Pseudachorutes texensis Christiansen & Bellinger, 1980
 Pseudachorutes tillieri Najt & Weiner, 1991
 Pseudachorutes vasylii
 Pseudachorutes vitalii
 Pseudachorutes yoshii Najt & Weiner, 1991

References

Further reading

 

Neanuridae
Articles created by Qbugbot
Springtail genera